The Fiji Times is a daily English-language newspaper published in Suva, Fiji. Established in Levuka on 4 September 1869 by George Littleton Griffiths, it is Fiji's oldest newspaper still operating. 

The Fiji Times is owned by Motibhai Group of Companies, which purchased it from Rupert Murdoch's News Corp on 22 September 2010. The Fiji Times Limited board is chaired by Kirit Patel (as of 2010), and includes Rajesh Patel, a resident director appointed in 2010 and Jinesh Patel, the marketing manager for the Motibhai Group of Companies. 

The former publisher Evan Hannah was forcibly removed from Fiji in 2008 as he was accused by the interim government of meddling in Fijian politics. This was prior to the sale by News Corp to the Motibhai Group of Companies.

An online edition is published, featuring local news, sport and weather.

History 
Two editions of the Fiji Times manufactured from bark-cloth are held at the Auckland Museum. The editions, from July 4, 1908 and February 17, 1909, provide and insight into the production of newspapers in the colonial era in the tropical Pacific. The editions are printed on a single white laminate bark cloth, also known as masi in Fiji, and was of a standard width requiring no trimming to fit in the press. Sometimes, the left or right sides were fringed by cutting the sheet to a depth of around 20mm. These editions are some of about a dozen known examples of bark cloth newspapers worldwide.

Title history

Coups and censorship 

The Rabuka administration censored the Fiji Times for a while following the first military coup of 14 May 1987. In protest, the newspaper published an edition with large blank spaces, where articles censored by the military would have been placed.

The Fiji Times announced on 5 December 2006, in the wake of the overthrow of the civilian government by the military, that it was suspending publication rather than bow to government censorship. Military officers had visited the premises that evening to prohibit the publication of any "propaganda" in support of the deposed government of Prime Minister Laisenia Qarase. The online edition would be continuing publication as normal, however. Just before midday on 6 December, the military granted permission for the Times to resume publication without censorship.

The Times reported on 9 December that two members of the public had been detained and questioned by the Military over letters they had written to the Times editor during the week, and were given a "verbal warning."

Nonetheless, from December 2006 to April 2009, the Times was able to publish continuously articles critical of the interim government. The latter voiced its displeasure, but did not impose censorship. Following the 2009 Fijian constitutional crisis, however, all Fiji's media were censored, including the Fiji Times. Censors are present in the paper's newsrooms. The newspaper's chief editor Netani Rika told Radio New Zealand International that "his journalists continue to cover every story in detail as if they were working in a democratic country without restrictions. And he says they challenge the censors by putting every possible news item before them." The website of the Fiji Times has also been censored since April 2009.

Criticism
The Fiji Labour Party was once highly critical of the Fiji Times, accusing it of political bias. In July 2008, the party published a report alleging that the Fiji Times had collaborated with others in a deliberate effort to unseat the 1999/2000 Labour-led government.

See also

Culture of Fiji

References

External links
 L.G. Usher: Brief History of The Fiji Times, Paper read to the Fiji Society on October 15, 1962

Fijian culture
English-language newspapers published in Oceania
Newspapers published in Fiji
Publications established in 1869
Former News Corporation subsidiaries
1869 establishments in Fiji